Prior to its uniform adoption of proportional representation in 1999, the United Kingdom used first-past-the-post for the European elections in England, Scotland and Wales. The European Parliament constituencies used under that system were smaller than the later regional constituencies and only had one Member of the European Parliament each.

The constituency of London South East was one of them.

When it was created in England in 1979, it consisted of the Westminster Parliament constituencies of Beckenham, Bexleyheath, Chislehurst, Erith and Crayford, Orpington, Ravensbourne, Sidcup, Woolwich East and Woolwich West.

United Kingdom Parliamentary constituencies were redrawn in 1983 and the European constituencies were altered to reflect this. The new seat comprised the following Westminster constituencies: Beckenham, Bexleyheath, Chislehurst, Eltham, Erith and Crayford, Greenwich, Old Bexley and Sidcup, Orpington, Ravensbourne and Woolwich. These boundaries were used in 1984 and 1989. Greenwich was removed for the 1994 European Parliament election.

Members of the European Parliament

Elections

References

External links
 David Boothroyd's United Kingdom Election Results

South East
20th century in London
1979 establishments in England
1999 disestablishments in England
Constituencies established in 1979
Constituencies disestablished in 1999